Invershin railway station is a railway station in the Highland council area of Scotland. ScotRail, who manage the station, operate all services.

History 
The station opened on 13 April 1868, as part of the Sutherland Railway, later becoming part of the Highland Railway and later the London, Midland and Scottish Railway.

Location 

Facilities 
Invershin only has very basic facilities, being a waiting shelter, a help point and bike racks. As there are no facilities to purchase tickets, passengers must buy one in advance, or from the guard on the train.

Previously, passengers wishing to board a train at Scotscalder had to flag the train by raising their arm (as is still done at other request stops around the country); this meant that the driver needed to reduce the train's speed before a request stop (to look out for any potential passengers on the platform and be able to stop if necessary), even if the platform was empty. The new system consists of an automatic kiosk (with a button for passengers to press) at the platform; this will alert the driver about any waiting passengers in advance and, if there is no requirement to stop, the train can maintain line speed through the request stops, thus improving reliability on the whole line.

Passenger volume 

The statistics cover twelve month periods that start in April.

Services 
In the December 2021 timetable, four trains call at Invershin each way (four to Inverness, four to Wick via Thurso) on weekdays and Saturdays. On Sundays, there is just one train each way.

This station is designated as a request stop. This means that passengers intending to alight must inform the guard in advance, and any passengers wishing to board must press a "request" button located at the kiosk on the platform.

References

Railway stations in Sutherland
Railway stations in Great Britain opened in 1868
Railway stations served by ScotRail
Former Highland Railway stations
Railway request stops in Great Britain